The 2014 Bitburger Open was the fifteenth Grand Prix Gold and Grand Prix tournament of the 2014 BWF Grand Prix Gold and Grand Prix. The tournament was held in Saarlandhalle, Saarbrücken, Germany October 28 until November 2, 2014 and had a total purse of $120,000.

Men's singles

Seeds

  Viktor Axelsen  (Withdrew)
  Chou Tien-chen (Champion)
  Tian Houwei 
  Marc Zwiebler 
  Rajiv Ouseph 
  Hsu Jen-hao 
  H. S. Prannoy 
  Eric Pang
  Wong Wing Ki 
  Sourabh Varma 
  Scott Evans 
  Dieter Domke 
  Chen Yuekun 
  Vladimir Ivanov 
  B. Sai Praneeth 
  Vladimir Malkov

Finals

Top half

Section 1

Section 2

Section 3

Section 4

Bottom half

Section 5

Section 6

Section 7

Section 8

Women's singles

Seeds

  Carolina Marin 
  Michelle Li 
  Zhang Beiwen 
  Sun Yu 
  Yip Pui Yin 
  Beatriz Corrales 
  Hsu Ya-ching 
  Lindaweni Fanetri

Finals

Top half

Section 1

Section 2

Bottom half

Section 3

Section 4

Men's doubles

Seeds

  Mathias Boe / Carsten Mogensen (Withdrew)
  Mads Conrad-Petersen / Mads Pieler Kolding
  Michael Fuchs / Johannes Schoettler
  Vladimir Ivanov / Ivan Sozonov
  Anders Skaarup Rasmussen / Kim Astrup Sorensen
  Wang Yilv / Zhang Wen 
  Berry Anggriawan / Ricky Karanda Suwardi 
  Adam Cwalina / Przemyslaw Wacha

Finals

Top half

Section 1

Section 2

Bottom half

Section 3

Section 4

Women's doubles

Seeds

  Eefje Muskens / Selena Piek 
  Gabriela Stoeva / Stefani Stoeva
  Anastasia Chervyakova / Nina Vislova
  Samantha Barning / Iris Tabeling
  Xia Huan / Zhong Qianxin
  Dian Fitriani / Nadya Melati 
  Johanna Goliszewski / Carla Nelte 
  Heather Olver / Lauren Smith

Finals

Top half

Section 1

Section 2

Bottom half

Section 3

Section 4

Mixed doubles

Seeds

  Chris Adcock / Gabrielle Adcock
  Michael Fuchs / Birgit Michels
  Danny Bawa Chrisnanta / Vanessa Neo
  Max Schwenger / Carla Nelte
  Huang Kaixiang / Jia Yifan
  Zheng Siwei / Chen Qingchen 
  Jacco Arends / Selena Piek 
  Peter Kaesbauer / Isabel Herttrich

Finals

Top half

Section 1

Section 2

Bottom half

Section 3

Section 4

References

2014 in German sport
Sport in Saarbrücken
Bitburger Open Grand Prix Gold
SaarLorLux Open